Jaan Ki Baazi is a 1985 Indian Hindi-language action film directed by Ajay Kashyap, starring Sanjay Dutt, Anita Raj, Anuradha Patel, and Gulshan Grover. The film was remade in Telugu as Mr. Hero starring Dr. Rajasekhar.

Plot Summary
This story is about a woman named Geeta, who has sworn to avenge the death of her late father. While searching for her father's murderers, she befriends (and later marries) Inspector Amar. He eventually sacrifices his life in the line of duty. Following Amar's death, Geeta joins the police force and continues searching for the murderers of her father. During this process she meets an auto-driver named Laxman. He helps her and endangers himself to confront the people who murdered Geeta's father.

Cast

Sanjay Dutt as Inspector Amar / Laxman (Double Role)
Anita Raj as Geeta 
Anuradha Patel as Sundari
Gulshan Grover as Cheetah
Goga Kapoor as Mahendra
Dan Dhanoa as Sanga
Shafi Inamdar as Inspector Ranjit Waghmare
Swaroop Sampat as Renu Waghmare
Rakesh Bedi as Havaldar Tendulkar
Satyen Kappu as Geeta's Father
Seema Deo as Amar's Mother
Jagdish Raj as Police Commissioner
Robin Bhatt as Press Reporter Sharma
Manik Irani as Ranga

Soundtrack
Lyrics: Anjaan

References

External links

 1985 films
 1980s Hindi-language films
 Films scored by Anu Malik
 Hindi films remade in other languages
 Films directed by Ajay Kashyap
Indian action drama films